Admiral Fremantle may refer to:

Charles Fremantle (1800–1869), British Royal Navy admiral
Edmund Fremantle (1836–1929), British Royal Navy admiral
Sydney Fremantle (1867–1958), British Royal Navy admiral
Thomas Fremantle (Royal Navy officer) (1765–1819), British Royal Navy vice admiral